The Port Curtis colonial by-election, 1863 was a by-election held on 12 May 1863 in the electoral district of Port Curtis for the Queensland Legislative Assembly.

History
On 11 April 1863, Alfred Sandeman, the member for Port Curtis resigned due to complaints about his inactivity by his constituents. John Douglas won the resulting by-election on 12 May 1863.

See also
 Members of the Queensland Legislative Assembly, 1860–1863

References

1863 elections in Australia
Queensland state by-elections
1860s in Queensland